Gardens in Autumn is a 2006 French comedy film directed by Otar Iosseliani.

Cast 
 Séverin Blanchet as Vincent, le ministre
 Jacynthe Jacquet as Barbara, la balayeuse
 Otar Iosseliani as Arnaud
 Lily Lavina as Mathilde, la rousse
 Denis Lambert as Gégé, le bistrotier
 Michel Piccoli as Marie, la mère de Vincent
 Pascal Vincent as Théodière, le deuxième ministre

References

External links 

2006 comedy films
2006 films
French comedy films
Films directed by Otar Iosseliani
2000s French films